The Committee on the Environment, Public Health and Food Safety (ENVI) is a committee of the European Parliament. It has 81 full members and is currently chaired by Pascal Canfin.

Evolution
During the 1990s its relatively low importance led to its being referred to unfavourably by MEPs as the "Cinderella committee". However, since then the committee's powers have increased. The co-decision procedure for legislation, which grants greater powers to the Parliament, has been extended to more policy areas. Notably, the areas covered by this committee were the main recipients of these new powers. The rising importance of the issues it deals with (for example, global warming) has also meant that it has become one of the most important committees in Parliament. The committee's open sessions, as well as constituting a major forum within the Parliament, are usually well attended by both business lobbyists and representatives from environmental NGOs.

Responsibilities
The committee is responsible for:

1.   environmental policy and environmental protection measures, in particular concerning:
(a)   climate change,
(b)   air, soil and water pollution, waste management and recycling, dangerous substances and preparations, noise levels and the protection of biodiversity,
(c)   sustainable development,
(d)   international and regional measures and agreements aimed at protecting the environment,
(e)   restoration of environmental damage,
(f)   civil protection,
(g)   the European Environment Agency,
(h)   the European Chemicals Agency;

2.   public health, in particular:
(a)   programmes and specific actions in the field of public health,
(b)   pharmaceutical and cosmetic products,
(c)   health aspects of bioterrorism,
(d)   the European Medicines Agency and the European Centre for Disease Prevention and Control;

3.   food safety issues, in particular:
(a)   the labelling and safety of foodstuffs,
(b)   veterinary legislation concerning protection against risks to human health; public health checks on foodstuffs and food production systems,
(c)   the European Food Safety Authority.

See also 
 European Food Safety Authority
 European Commissioner for the Environment
 Directorate-General for the Environment (European Commission)
 European Commissioner for Health
 Directorate-General for Health and Consumer Protection (European Commission)
 European Commissioner for Enterprise & Industry
 Directorate-General for Enterprise and Industry (European Commission)

References

External links
 Official Homepage

Environment
Food safety organizations
Public health organizations
Environmental policies organizations
European Union health policy
Parliamentary committees on Healthcare